The Jawaharlal Nehru State Museum (or simply Jawaharlal Nehru Museum) is the state museum of Arunachal Pradesh, in Itanagar. Established in the 1980s, it showcases aspects of tribal life of Arunachal Pradesh, India. These include clothing, headdress, weapons, handicraft, music instruments, jewellery and other artifacts of daily use and culture, besides archeological finds.

Over the years, the museum has become an important tourist destination in the state capital.

Collection and activities
The ground floor of the museum houses an extensive ethnographic collection, including traditional art, musical instruments, religious objects, and handicrafts, like wood carving and cane products, while the first floor has archaeological objects found in Ita Fort, Noksparbat and Malinithan in West Siang district.

Apart from its collection, the museum runs a workshop for traditional cane products at its Handicrafts Centre. The museum shop sells tribal handicrafts.

In 2011, Tapi Mra, the first person from the state to scale Mount Everest, donated his entire expedition gear to the museum.

References

Buildings and structures in Arunachal Pradesh
Local museums in India
Itanagar
Culture of Arunachal Pradesh
Folk art museums and galleries in India
Ethnic museums in India
Tourist attractions in Arunachal Pradesh
Monuments and memorials to Jawaharlal Nehru
State museums in India
1980s establishments in Arunachal Pradesh
Museums established in the 1980s
Museums with year of establishment missing